The Schuylerville Stakes is an American Thoroughbred horse race held annually at Saratoga Race Course in Saratoga Springs, New York. Open to two-year-old fillies, it is contested at a distance of six furlongs on dirt. A Grade III event, it currently offers a purse of $150,000. In 2006, the race was downgraded from a Grade II to a Grade III. By tradition, the Schuylerville opens the Saratoga meet each year. The race is named for the nearby town of Schuylerville, New York.

The race was hosted by Belmont Park in 1943, 1944, and 1945, and in 1952 at the now defunct Jamaica Race Course.  Inaugurated at a distance of five and one-half furlongs, it was contested at that distance through 1959 and from 1962 through 1968. It was run in two divisions in 1959, 1965, and 1974.

Records
Speed record: (At current distance of 6 furlongs)
1:09 4/5 – Laughing Bridge (1974)

Most wins by a jockey:
 5 – John Velazquez (2002, 2006, 2011, 2014, 2016)

Most wins by a trainer:
 6 – D. Wayne Lukas  (1986, 1987, 1988, 1995, 1999, 2004)
 6 – Todd Pletcher (2002, 2003, 2006, 2011, 2014, 2016)

Most wins by an owner:
 4 – Wheatley Stable (1933, 1959, 1962, 1969)

Winners of the Schuylerville Stakes since 1947

Earlier winners

 1946 – Bright Song
 1945 – Red Shoes
 1944 – Ace Card
 1943 – Boojiana
 1942 – Brittany
 1941 – Romping Home
 1940 – Nasca
 1939 – Teacher
 1938 – Soldierette
 1937 – Creole Maid
 1936 – Maecloud
 1935 – Parade Girl
 1934 – Uppermost
 1933 – Slapdash
 1932 – Volette
 1931 – Polonaise
 1930 – Panasette
 1929 – Flying Gal
 1928 – Atlantis
 1927 – Pennant Queen
 1926 – Aromagne
 1925 – Taps
 1924 – Royalite
 1923 – Befuddle
 1922 – Edict
 1921 – Miss Joy
 1920 – Careful
 1919 – Homely
 1918 – Tuscaloosa

References
 The Schuylerville Stakes at the NTRA
 The Schuylerville Stakes at Pedigree query
 The Schuylerville Stakes at Saratoga Springs Race course

1918 establishments in New York (state)
Horse races in New York (state)
Saratoga Race Course
Flat horse races for two-year-old fillies
Graded stakes races in the United States
Grade 3 stakes races in the United States
Recurring sporting events established in 1918